Shahrak-e Fajr is a village in Soltanabad Rural District, in the Central District of Ramhormoz County, Khuzestan Province, Iran. At the 2006 census, its population was 140, in 25 families.

References 

Populated places in Ramhormoz County